World Mission Sunday is a day set aside for the Catholic Church throughout the world to publicly renew its commitment to the missionary movement, coordinated by the Pontifical Mission Societies, who are also known as Missio. It is celebrated on the penultimate (next-to-last) Sunday of October every year,. It was created by Pope Pius XI in 1926 as the day of prayer for missions. Closely related to Society for the Propagation of the Faith.

References

Catholic holy days
October observances
Holidays and observances by scheduling (nth weekday of the month)
Christian Sunday observances